Angat, officially the Municipality of Angat,  is a 1st class municipality in the province of Bulacan, Philippines. According to the 2020 census, it has a population of 65,617 people.

Etymology
The Town of Angat got its name after the Tagalog word Angat (A-ngat), meaning 'elevated' or 'a high piece of land'.

History

Angat was originally a part of the Old Pueblo de Quingua, now Municipality of Plaridel. This fact was due most probably to the situation of the Rio de Quingua Angat River, which directly connects the town of Quingua, a community then located in the center of vast lands, covering plains and mountains alike.

Augustinian missionaries built a small visita (chapel) under the Parochial ministry of Paroquia de Santiago Matamoro de Quingua. In 1683 the visita of Angat made a Town Church and the whole Angat where established as a new Pueblo.

Today, still stands and legible, is the inscription at the façade of her church with a Roman Numeral "MDCCXII" translated to "1727" a year indicating the date of the erection the Angat Church's present building.

Geography

The towns of San Rafael, Bulacan and Bustos, Bulacan bound the town of Angat on the North. On the East by the vast Sierra Madre Mountain Ranges - Sierra Madre (Philippines), to its South by the towns of Norzagaray, Bulacan and Santa Maria, Bulacan.

The municipality of Angat has hilly and mountainous landscape that nestles Angat River - (Bulacan River) which snakes around eleven provinces in the Central Luzon Region. Angat River's main basin of water resource is from Sierra Madre Mountain Range (the longest mountain range in the Philippines) in Luzon island. During increment climate condition like continuous rainy days for days the water inundates to different river tributaries in its adjoining municipalities, as well as provinces through different rivers. To the southeast are 2 rivers: Santa Maria River of Santa Maria, Bulacan. Bunsuran River of Pandi, Bulacan. Balagtas River of Balagtas, Bulacan, and Bocaue River of Bocaue, Bulacan.

Angat's mountainous and hilly area has abundance of trees that are source of timber and wood materials, and unfortunately become an area of illegal logging. The mountainous areas, and lands close to the river shore, some of which are privately owned is rich in mineral deposit of silica. The vast area around Angat River is very high source of rocks and pebbles used for construction and garden landscaping.

Most areas have a very relaxing atmosphere of greenery seen in mountain heights and river shore lines where some fresh water fishes also multiplies.
Angat was once part of the 3rd district along with Norzagaray from 1987 to 2022 when it was moved to 6th district along with Santa Maria and Norzagaray.

Climate
The prevailing climatic conditions in the municipality is categorized into two (2) types: Wet season (Rainy Season or Monsoon Season) and Dry Season (Summer Season).

Barangays
Angat is subdivided into 16 barangays:

Demographics

Religion

The people of Angat are mostly devout Catholics. Their patron saint is Saint Monica. It displays baroque architecture, with its interior replicating the Sistine Chapel, recently remodeled but preserving its old architecture. In 1983, the Parish of the town celebrated its Tricentennial Foundation. Today, Angat has already Three Catholic Parishes within the town — the Saint Paul the Apostle Parish in Barangay Niugan, the Santa Rita de Cascia Parish in Barangay Binagbag, and the Santa Monica Parish in Poblacion.

Other religious groups include the Members Church of God International popularly known as Ang Dating Daan, Iglesia ni Cristo, and Jehovah's Witness, Methodists, Aglipayans, Adventists, Baptists, Mormons. There also some Evangelical, Pentecostal, Charismatic churches, ministries, fellowships and religious groups. Islam (Muslims) could also be found.

Economy

Government

Elected officials

List of former mayors

Education

Colegio de Sta Monica de Angat

The Angateños consider education as very important. It was the dream of many that there would be a Catholic school in Angat. This dream was realized in 1983 through the initiative and leadership of the founding members of the first Board of Trustees of Santa Monica Catholic School, Inc.: Bishop Cirilio R. Almario, Jr., Rev. Fr. Macario R. Manahan, Councilor Manuel C. De Guzman, Mrs. Angelita A. Cruz, Mr. Francisco C. Robles.
 
Through a memorandum of agreement between the Ministry of Social Services and Development and the Parents' Committee, the Day Care Center became Santa Monica Catholic Learning Center.
In 1985, the school was renamed Santa Monica Catholic School and given the permit to open and conduct Grade VI. The first batch of Grade VI graduates received their diplomas in March 1986.

On March 27, 1987, the high school department was formally opened. A year later, the school's name was changed to Colegio de Santa Monica de Angat to reflect the town's Hispanic heritage. In the same year, the St. Joseph Building was inaugurated. The first batch graduated in March 1990. Today, the school's population and physical structure continues to grow.

Other school

Culture and Tourism

Town festivities and events

As a predominantly Roman Catholic Christian community, every barangay has their own unique way of celebrating fiestas in honor of their respective patron saint. In the town proper where the old beautiful church of Angat is located, the locals celebrate their fiesta every 4 May in honor of its patron St. Monica, mother of St. Augustine.

Tourist attractions
 Angat River
 Heritage Houses
 Santa Monica Church (Santa Monica de Angat Church)
 Gawad Kalinga (Enchanted Farm)
 Fr. Blanco Museum (collection of flora de filipina)

Gallery

References

External links

 [ Philippine Standard Geographic Code]
 Philippine Census Information
 Angat Bulacan
 Angat, Bulacan at WN
 Angat.NET Our town, Our Home
 

Municipalities of Bulacan